Grigor Dimitrov was the defending champion but decided not to participate.
Josselin Ouanna won the title, defeating Maxime Teixeira 6–3, 6–2 in the final.

Seeds

Draw

Finals

Top half

Bottom half

References
 Main Draw
 Qualifying Draw

Challenger DCNS de Cherbourg - Singles
2012 Singles